The women's marathon was one of the road events at the 1983 World Championships in Athletics in Helsinki, Finland. It took place on 7 August 1983, starting and finishing at the Helsinki Olympic Stadium. The race was won by Norway's Grete Waitz in 2:28:09, ahead of Marianne Dickerson of the United States in second and the Soviet Union's Raisa Smekhnova in third.

In warm conditions, Rumiko Kaneko of Japan and Ireland's Carey May led in the early stages, before Jacqueline Gareau of Canada took over, trailed by a pack of runners which included two of the favourites, Waitz and Julie Brown. Ireland's Regina Joyce took the lead by the  point and opened a gap of around 30 seconds ahead of the chasing group. After , she was caught by a group led by Waitz, who was increasing the pace of the race. Gradually those running with her dropped back, leaving her to win the race by three minutes. Smekhnova was just ahead of Dickerson when they entered the stadium, but was passed by the American in a sprint finish.

Background
The women's marathon was not an established event at an international level. It had not featured in the Olympic Games and had only become popular during the 1970s. Historically, some experts claimed that running the marathon distance, was dangerous for women's health. As it gained prominence through the 1970s, there were calls for it to be added to the Olympics, though there was significant opposition. The governing body for athletics, the International Association of Athletics Federations (IAAF, now World Athletics) announced that it would be added to the programme for the inaugural World Championships in Athletics in 1983, making it the first global championships to feature a women's marathon.

In 1983, an American runner, Joan Benoit, established a new fastest time for the women's marathon, when she ran 2:22:43 at the 1983 Boston Marathon; cutting almost three minutes off the previous fastest time, held jointly by Allison Roe of New Zealand and Norway's Grete Waitz. Of the three, only Waitz was taking part in the World Championships: Benoit did not run in the Avon International Marathon in Los Angeles, which the United States used as a qualifying race, choosing to focus on shorter distances instead. In Benoit's absence, The Observer and The Times described Waitz as the favourite for the race. The American press rated Julie Brown as their best chance of victory in the race; writing in the Hartford Courant, Amby Burfoot said that despite the fact Waitz had beaten Brown in their previous meetings, Brown had "recently brought a new maturity to her road racing".

The race started at the Helsinki Olympic Stadium, and moved onto the streets of Helsinki, following an undulating course that Brown suggested would prevent fast times. The course passed Helsinki's docks, looped around the shore road, and past Market Square. After looping through downtown Helsinki, they returned to the stadium along the same route, to finish on the track.

Summary
Early on, Japan's Rumiko Kaneko and Ireland's Carey May led, passing the  mark in 18:14. Canada's Jacqueline Gareau then established a small lead, passing the  mark in 36:13, around  ahead of a pack which included: Waitz of Norway; all three United States runners, Marianne Dickerson, Debbie Eide and Brown; Rosa Mota of Portugal; Italy's Laura Fogli and May from Ireland.  later, Gareau still led, and the pack behind her had grown to include 13 runners. David Miller, a journalist for The Times, criticised her inexperience in pressing ahead too early, but Gareau said it was the only way she could secure a good finishing position. Her lead, which peaked at around 30 seconds, was eroded and she was passed by Ireland's Regina Joyce between  into the race. Waitz asked Brown if she thought they should go with her, but Brown said no: "She'll come back to us".

Joyce, who had also opened up a lead of 30 seconds at one stage, led the race until the  mark, when a surge from Waitz broke up the chasing group, and she led a smaller pack of five runners at the front. Along with Waitz were two Soviet athletes, Lyutsia Belyayeva and Raisa Smekhnova, Dickerson and Joyce. Running into the wind, they formed a single-file procession behind Waitz.  later, Waitz was clear at the front; Smekhnova had tried to stay with her for as long as possible, but Waitz continued to extend her lead. Brown was unable to match the leaders' pace from around the  stage due to an Achilles injury and dropped out of the race completely three miles later. Behind, Joyce had dropped out of medal contention when she had to stop for a toilet break, leaving Dickerson to vie with Smekhnova for second place. Waitz won the race in 2:28:09 and had time to complete a victory lap before Smekhnova narrowly led Dickerson as they entered the stadium. Dickerson had enough energy left for a sprint finish, and passed Smekhnova on the bend of the track, and finished second in 2:31:09, exactly three minutes behind Weitz, and four seconds ahead of Smekhnova, who claimed the bronze medal. Mota finished in fourth, while the early race leader, Gareau, placed fifth. Waitz, who was running her first female-only race, said that the makeup of the race changed her tactics significantly, as there were no men around her to share the pacing responsibilities: "Here, the final time didn't really matter. The idea was to win the Championship."

Results

See also
 1982 European Athletics Championships – Women's marathon
 Athletics at the 1984 Summer Olympics – Women's marathon
 1986 European Athletics Championships – Women's marathon

Notes

References

M
Marathons at the World Athletics Championships
1983 marathons
Women's marathons
World Championships in Athletics marathon
Marathons in Finland

nl:IAAF wereldkampioenschap marathon 1983